Mosaik is a German comic book magazine

Mosaik may also refer to:
Mosaik 2014, an album by German group Kreidler
Mosaik Solutions, American company

See also
Mosaic (disambiguation)